The following events occurred in August 1953:

August 1, 1953 (Saturday)
The 1953–54 DFB-Pokal football tournament opens in West Germany.
Indian Airlines, based in Delhi, begins operations, having been set up under the Air Corporations Act, 1953, by a merger of several domestic airlines.

August 2, 1953 (Sunday)
Born: Anthony Seldon, English historian and biographer, in Stepney

August 3, 1953 (Monday)
Born: Marlene Dumas, South African painter, in Cape Town

August 4, 1953 (Tuesday)
Born: Hiroyuki Usui, Japanese footballer and manager

August 5, 1953 (Wednesday)
 Operation Big Switch begins: The United Nations Command (UNC) repatriates over 75,823 prisoners of war (70,183 North Koreans and 5,640 Chinese), whilst the PVA/KPA repatriates 12,773 UNC POWs.  
The US Navy vessel Staten Island, in the southern Davis Strait, near Baffin Island, launches the first of six 1953 NRL flights, three of which reached altitude and returned data
Fred Zinnemann's war film From Here to Eternity, starring Burt Lancaster, Montgomery Clift, Deborah Kerr, Frank Sinatra, and Donna Reed, is premièred, despite the disapproval of both the US Army and the US Navy.
Born: András Ligeti, Hungarian violinist and conductor, in Pécs (died 2021)

August 6, 1953 (Thursday)
Died: Houseley Stevenson, 74, British-born American actor

August 7, 1953 (Friday)
The 1953 Irish Greyhound Derby is won by Spanish Battleship, trained by Tom Lynch and owned by Tim 'Chubb' O'Connor.

August 8, 1953 (Saturday)
 In an address to the Supreme Soviet Soviet prime minister Georgy Malenkov claims that the Soviet Union has developed a hydrogen bomb.
37 people are injured when a northbound Royal Scot train is derailed near Abington, Scotland, UK, on its way down from Beattock Summit; the track had buckled as a result of unusually high temperatures.
In the Western Australian National Football League, Bernie Naylor kicks a WANFL record 23 goals against , including twelve in one quarter.
Born: Nigel Mansell, English racing driver, in Upton-upon-Severn

August 9, 1953 (Sunday)
The British ferry St Columba runs aground in Ettrick Bay, Kyles of Bute, Buteshire, but is refloated later in the day.

August 10, 1953 (Monday)
 The Canadian federal election results in victory for the Liberal Party of Canada and prime minister Louis St. Laurent. 
 Pete Schoening saves the lives of several members of the American K2 expedition, one of the most famous events in mountaineering history.
The 1953 Pan Arab Games conclude in Alexandria, Egypt. The home country finishes top of the medal table.

August 11, 1953 (Tuesday)
Hurricane Barbara forms in the southern Bahamas. 

August 12, 1953 (Wednesday)
1953 Ceylonese Hartal: A country-wide demonstration of civil disobedience and strikes, in protest against government policy, is organised by the Lanka Sama Samaja Party in Ceylon (now Sri Lanka). It is the first such protest in the country since independence.
 A magnitude 7.2 earthquake devastates most of the Ionian Sea islands in Greece's worst natural disaster in centuries.
 Soviet atomic bomb project: "Joe 4" – The first Soviet thermonuclear weapon is detonated at Semipalatinsk Test Site, Kazakh SSR.

August 13, 1953 (Thursday)
 Four million workers go on strike in France to protest against austerity measures.

August 14, 1953 (Friday)
Born: James Horner, American film composer, in Los Angeles (died 2015, plane crash)

August 15, 1953 (Saturday)
 According to Japanese government official confirmed report, a heavy torrential massive rain, following to dam burst, levee collapse and landslides affect Wazuka, Minamiyamashiro, Kyoto Prefecture, Japan; a total of 430 persons are killed.
 Ten people die in the Irk Valley Junction rail crash at Collyhurst near Manchester, UK.
The 1953 Summer Deaflympics open in Brussels, Belgium, lasting for four days.

August 16, 1953 (Sunday)
Following a referendum, Mohammad Mosaddegh officially announces the dissolution of Iran's parliament.

August 17, 1953 (Monday)
 The first planning session of Narcotics Anonymous is held in Southern California, United States (see October 5).
A gas screw vessel, the Dickie Ray, is stranded off Carmanah Lighthouse, Vancouver Island, BC, Canada, and lost.
Born: Herta Müller, German novelist, poet, essayist and Nobel laureate, in Nițchidorf, Romania

August 18, 1953 (Tuesday)
 The second of the controversial Kinsey Reports, Sexual Behavior in the Human Female, is published in the US.

August 19, 1953 (Wednesday)
 1953 Iranian coup d'état: The United States Central Intelligence Agency and the UK are involved in overthrowing the government of Mohammad Mosaddegh in Iran, so as to retain power for Shah Mohammad Reza Pahlavi.

August 20, 1953 (Thursday)
 King Mohammed V of Morocco is deposed by the French government and exiled to Corsica. He is replaced by a puppet monarch, his relation Mohammed Ben Aarafa.
 The United States returns to West Germany 382 ships it had captured during World War II.
 Seventeen U.S. Air Force F-84G Thunderjets make the longest-ever nonstop flight by jet fighters, travelling from the United States to the United Kingdom by means of aerial refueling.
The United States Army test-fires the first Redstone missile at Cape Canaveral, Florida. The Redstone, on which research and development had begun in 1950, was later used as a launch vehicle in the crewed suborbital flights and in other development flights in Project Mercury.

August 21, 1953 (Friday)
The US minesweeper USS Fidelity (AM-443) is launched in New Orleans, Louisiana.

August 22, 1953 (Saturday)
Devil's Island, the penal colony in the Salvation Islands of French Guiana, is closed down, a year after its last use.

August 23, 1953 (Sunday)
The 1953 Swiss Grand Prix is held at Bremgarten Circuit in Bern and is won by Italian driver Alberto Ascari.

August 24, 1953 (Monday)
Born: Sam Torrance, Scottish golfer, in Largs

August 25, 1953 (Tuesday)
 The general strike ends in France.

August 26, 1953 (Wednesday)
Born: David Hurley, Governor-General of Australia, in Wollongong
Died: José Hipólito Raposo, 68, Portuguese politician, writer, lawyer and historian

August 27, 1953 (Thursday)
Voting concludes in the 1953 Mauritian general election, resulting in victory for the Labour Party, which wins 13 of the 19 seats on the Legislative Council.  
Roman Holiday, starring Gregory Peck and Audrey Hepburn, directed by William Wyler, receives its première and makes a star of Hepburn.
Born: Peter Stormare, Swedish actor, in Kumla

August 28, 1953 (Friday)
 Nippon TV, Japan's first commercial television channel, is launched.
In Williamsport, Pennsylvania, United States, the 1953 Little League World Series baseball championship for juniors is won by the team from Birmingham, Alabama.
Ireland's Department of Agriculture, Food and the Marine issues the Fisheries (Delegation of Ministerial Functions) Order 1953.

August 29, 1953 (Saturday)
The Corangamite by-election for the Australian House of Representatives, brought about by the death of Liberal MP Allan McDonald, is a victory for Liberal candidate Dan Mackinnon.
The Lang by-election for the Australian House of Representatives, brought about by the death of Labor MP Dan Mulcahy, is a victory for the Labor candidate Frank Stewart.

August 30, 1953 (Sunday)
The 1000 km of Nürburgring motor race takes place in West Germany. Alberto Ascari and his co-driver Giuseppe Farina are victorious.
Died:
Gaetano Merola, Italian conductor (b. 1881)
Maurice Nicoll, British psychiatrist (b. 1884)

August 31, 1953 (Monday)
The 1953 GP Ouest–France cycle race is won by Serge Blusson of France.
The Soviet cargo ship MV Akademik Karpinsky founders near Władysławowo, Poland, on a voyage between Kaliningrad and Amsterdam.

References

1953
1953-08
1953-08